Then and Now is the second studio album by American R&B group Livin Out Loud. "More Than a Fantasy" was the first hit from the album. The album received further attention when the singles "Why U Gotta Lie" and "Cuz I Gotta Know" surged into popularity with UK Urban and Dance listeners.

The songs "I Can't Stop," "You Make Me Smile" and "Cuz I Gotta Know (Souled Out Mix)" appear on the UK release of their 2015 album, Take It Easy.

Track listing

References

External links 
 Livin Out Loud: Then and Now on CD Baby
 

2004 albums